James E. Wilson (1 January 1909 – after 1937) was an English footballer who played in the Football League for Bradford Park Avenue, Bristol City, Halifax Town, Leeds United and Mansfield Town.

References

1909 births
Year of death missing
People from Garforth
English footballers
Association football goalkeepers
Leeds United F.C. players
Halifax Town A.F.C. players
Shrewsbury Town F.C. players
Shirebrook Miners Welfare F.C. players
Mansfield Town F.C. players
Ashfield United F.C. players
Bradford (Park Avenue) A.F.C. players
Bristol City F.C. players
Bristol Rovers F.C. players
English Football League players